Ernest Nalani 'Juggie' Heen, Jr. (August 31, 1930 – June 30, 2013) was an American politician.

Heen served in the United States Air Force. He then work in real estate development and sales. Heen then served in the Hawaii House of Representatives 1963-1967 and 1969-1971 as a Democrat.

Notes

1930 births
2013 deaths
Businesspeople from Hawaii
Democratic Party members of the Hawaii House of Representatives
Deaths from pancreatic cancer
Deaths from liver cancer
Deaths from cancer in Hawaii
Hawaii politicians of Japanese descent
Military personnel from Hawaii
American military personnel of Japanese descent
20th-century American businesspeople